Susanne Lewis is a German American musician, songwriter and artist. She is a solo-artist and a founder or collaborator of a number of bands and music projects. She has a band with Bob Drake called Corpses as Bedmates and Hail, and she also releases music under her own name. She was a member of the band Thinking Plague and has guested on albums by 5uu's (Hunger's Teeth, 1994) and Biota (Object Holder, 1995).

Discography

Bands and projects
Hail
2006 Hello Debris (CD) Recommended Records, U.K.
1993 Kirk (CD) Recommended Records, U.K.
1991 Turn of the Screw (CD) Recommended Records, U.K.
1988 Gypsy Cat & Gypsy Bird (LP) Prolific Records, USA.
1991 RēR Records Quarterly Vol. 3 No.3 (LP) Recommended Records, U.K.

Venus Handcuffs

(Which turned into Hail)
2004 Venus Handcuffs (CD) Ad Hoc Records, USA.

Thinking Plague
2000 Early Plague Years (CD Cuneiform Records, U.S.
1989 In This Life (CD) Recommended Records, U.K.
1987 Moonsongs (LP) Dead Man's Curve Records, U.K.
1989 RēR Records Quarterly Vol.2 No.4 (LP) Recommended Records, U.K.
1994 RēR Quarterly Vol.4 No.1 (CD) Recommended Records, U.K.

Kissyfur
1995 Frambuesa (CD) Starlight Furniture Company, USA.
1993 Self-Titled (CD) Funky Mushroom, USA.

Susanne Lewis
2000 Self-Titled (CD) Sedimental, USA.
Hail/Snail
(a collaboration with Azalia Snail)
1994 How to Live with a Tiger (CD) Funky Mushroom, USA.
1993 Hail/Snail 7" (single) Funky Mushroom, USA.

Corpses as Bedmates
1987 Venus Handcuffs (LP) Dead Man's Curve Records, U.K.

Biota
1995 Object Holder (CD Recommended Records, U.K.
5uu's
1994 Hunger's Teeth'' (CD Recommended Records, U.K.

References

External links
Susanne Lewis Homepage
Susanne Lewis Online Art 

1963 births
Living people
American women singers
American women composers
21st-century American composers
American women songwriters
21st-century American women musicians
21st-century women composers